Filip Dumić (born October 8, 1990) is a Serbian professional basketball player who plays for Radnički Kragujevac of the Basketball League of Serbia.

Professional career
On August 17, 2013, he signed with Borac Čačak. On January 22, 2018, Dumić signed with Romanian basketball club Timba Timișoara. On September 11, 2018, he signed with Macedonian basketball club Kumanovo.

References

External links
 Profile at realgm.com
 Profile at eurobasket.com

1990 births
Living people
Basketball players from Čačak
Point guards
OKK Konstantin players
KK Borac Čačak players
KK Vršac players
KK Tamiš players
KK Sloga players
KK Mladost Čačak players
KKK Radnički players
Serbian men's basketball players
Serbian expatriate basketball people in Bosnia and Herzegovina
Serbian expatriate basketball people in Romania
Serbian expatriate basketball people in North Macedonia
Serbian expatriate basketball people in Montenegro